Lonchocarpus calcaratus is a species of legume in the family Fabaceae.  It is found in Costa Rica and Panama.  It is threatened by habitat loss.

References

calcaratus
Flora of Costa Rica
Flora of Panama
Vulnerable plants
Taxonomy articles created by Polbot